The 2003 Kansas State Wildcats football team represented Kansas State University in the 2003 NCAA Division I-A football season.  The team's head coach was Bill Snyder.  The Wildcats played their home games in KSU Stadium. The team finished the season with a win–loss record of 11 wins and 4 losses, and a Big 12 Conference record of 6 wins and  2 losses. They notched a stunning 35–7 victory over the #1 ranked Oklahoma Sooners in the Big 12 Championship Game.  With their 1st conference championship since 1934, they earned a berth in one of the Bowl Championship Series bowl games, the 2004 Fiesta Bowl, where they were defeated by the Ohio State Buckeyes, 35–28.  The Wildcats played 15 games, most in school history.

During the 2002 and 2003 seasons teams were allowed to schedule 12 games as well as a kickoff game.  As a result, Kansas State became only the second team in the modern era to play a 15-game schedule.  The first was the 1996 BYU Cougars.

Running back Darren Sproles led the nation in rushing, and the Wildcats scored 549 points, good for third all-time at Kansas State.

Until 2022, this was the only season in college football history in which Kansas State, Kansas, and Missouri all played in a bowl game in the same season.

Schedule

Roster

Rankings

Game summaries

vs. California

Troy State

McNeese State

UMass

Marshall

at Texas

at Oklahoma State

Colorado

Kansas

Baylor

at Iowa State

at Nebraska

The Wildcats clinched a share of the Big 12 North title by winning in Lincoln for the first time since 1968. Kansas State also handed the Cornhuskers their worst defeat at Memorial Stadium since 1958.

Missouri

    
    
    
    
    
    

Darren Sproles ran for a school-record 273 yards in the win over Missouri. Sproles also broke the single-season rushing record for the second consecutive year.

vs. Oklahoma (Big 12 Championship Game)

Kansas State manhandled the #1 Sooners at Arrowhead Stadium to win their first conference title since 1934.

vs. Ohio State (Fiesta Bowl)

Source:

Statistics

Scores by quarter

Team

Offense

Rushing

Passing

Receiving

Awards and honors

2004 NFL Draft

References

Kansas State
Kansas State Wildcats football seasons
Big 12 Conference football champion seasons
Kansas State Wildcats football